This is a list of Brazilian television related events from 1985.

Events

Debuts

Television shows

1970s
Turma da Mônica (1976–present)
Sítio do Picapau Amarelo (1977–1986)

1980s
Balão Mágico (TV series) (1983-1986)

Births
21 April - Paloma Bernardi, actress & dancer
4 July - Mariana Rios, actress, singer-songwriter & TV host

Deaths

See also
1985 in Brazil
List of Brazilian films of 1985